László Nagy may refer to:

 László Nagy (Scouting) (1921–2009), Secretary General of the World Organization of the Scout Movement from 1968 to 1985
 László Nagy (figure skater) (1927–2005), figure skater
 László Nagy (politician), in the List of observers to the European Parliament for Slovakia, 2003–04
 László Nagy (poet) (1925–1978), Hungarian poet
 László Nagy (footballer) (born 1949), football (soccer) player
 László Nagy (handballer) (born 1981), Hungarian handball player
 László Nagy (canoeist), Hungarian sprint canoeist
 László Moholy-Nagy (1895–1946), Hungarian artist, designer and Bauhaus instructor
 László B. Nagy (born 1958), Hungarian politician
László Nagy (runner) (born 1975), Hungarian long-distance runner
László Nagy (decathlete) (born 1960), Hungarian decathlete